Forest of Evil is an EP by Demdike Stare, released on April 26, 2010 by Modern Love Records.

Track listing

Personnel
Adapted from the Forest of Evil liner notes.

Demdike Stare
 Sean Canty – producer
 Miles Whittaker – producer

Production and additional personnel
 Andreas Lubich – mastering
 Radu Prepeleac – design
 Andy Votel – cover art

Release history

References

External links 
 

2010 EPs
Demdike Stare albums
Modern Love Records albums
Instrumental EPs